Lisa Lyon or Lyons may refer to:
Lisa Posthumus Lyons (born 1980), American politician
Lisa Lyon (born 1953), American bodybuilder
Lisa Lyons, a fictional character in the 2011 play The Lyons